Jani Lyyski (born 16 March 1983) is a Finnish former footballer.

Club career
Lyyski started his career in IFK Mariehamn he played for seven years, before moving on to Vaasan Palloseura in 2008. On 26 November, he signed on for Swedish side Djurgårdens IF.

In March 2012 Lyyski returned to IFK Mariehamn. His father Pekka Lyyski is a former manager of IFK Mariehamn.

International career

On 18 January 2010 Lyyski made his first appearance at Finnish national football team in friendly match against South Korea in Málaga, Spain. He was in the starting line-up and played the whole match.

Honours

Individual
Veikkausliiga Defender of the Year: 2016

References

External links
Jani Lyyski at Guardian Football

1983 births
Living people
Finnish footballers
Finnish expatriate footballers
Finland international footballers
Veikkausliiga players
Allsvenskan players
Djurgårdens IF Fotboll players
Vaasan Palloseura players
IFK Mariehamn players
Association football defenders
Expatriate footballers in Sweden
Finnish expatriate sportspeople in Sweden
People from Mariehamn
Sportspeople from Åland